Carex alma is a species of sedge known by the common name sturdy sedge. It is native to the southwestern United States and northern Mexico, where it grows in moist spots in a number of habitat types. This sedge forms a thick clump of thin stems up to 90 centimeters in length and long, thready leaves. The leaves have basal sheaths with conspicuous red coloration, often spotting. The inflorescence is a dense to open cluster of many spikelets occurring both at the ends of stems and at nodes. Each cluster is up to 15 centimeters long and 1 to 2 wide. The plant is sometimes dioecious, with an individual sedge bearing either male or female flowers. The female, pistillate flowers have white or white-edged bracts. The male, staminate flowers have visible anthers 2 millimeters long or longer. The fruit is coated in a sac called a perigynium which is gold to dark brown in color and has a characteristic bit of spongy tissue at the base.

External links
Jepson Manual Treatment
USDA Plants Profile
Flora of North America
Photo gallery

alma
Flora of the Southwestern United States
Flora of Mexico
Plants described in 1889
Taxa named by Liberty Hyde Bailey